Tony Edjomariegwe is a Nigerian professional footballer who plays as a forward.

References

Nigerian footballers
Living people
1992 births
Association football forwards
Moghreb Tétouan players
Olympic Club de Safi players
Kano Pillars F.C. players
Nasarawa United F.C. players
Sudan Premier League players